Hannah Gadsby (born 1978) is an Australian comedian, writer, and actress. She began her career in Australia after winning the national final of the Raw Comedy competition for new comedians in 2006. In 2018, her show Nanette on Netflix won the Primetime Emmy Award for Outstanding Writing for a Variety Special and a Peabody Award.

Starting in 2019, she toured internationally with her show Douglas and the recorded special was released on Netflix in 2020. In 2021, she was awarded an honorary doctorate from the University of Tasmania. In March 2022, she published Ten Steps to Nanette: A Memoir Situation.

Early life

Hannah Gadsby was born in Smithton, a small town on the remote north-west coast of Tasmania. She was the youngest of five children. She attended Smithton High School from 1990 to 1995. In year 12, she attended Launceston College, where she had a nervous breakdown. She began studying at the University of Tasmania in Hobart but later transferred to the Australian National University, where she earned a bachelor's degree in art history and curatorship in 2003.

After her education, Gadsby worked in bookshops in Canberra and became a projectionist at an outdoor cinema in Darwin. She then spent two years picking vegetables and planting trees along the east coast of Australia. She became homeless, which she later attributed in part to her ADHD, and ill enough with acute pancreatitis to require hospitalisation.

Career

Stand-up comedy
On a visit to her sister in Adelaide in 2006, Gadsby entered Raw Comedy in 2006, progressing through the heats to win the national prize. As the winner, she was sent to the So You Think You're Funny? competition at the Edinburgh Fringe Festival, where she won second prize. Her first solo show was titled Hannah Gadsby is Wrong and Broken, and won the 2007 Best Newcomer Award at the Edinburgh Fringe Festival before she went on tour with the show in Edinburgh and New York. In 2008, she performed Meat the Musical with Amelia Jane Hunter at the Melbourne International Comedy Festival. She continued to perform at festivals, including the Melbourne International Comedy Festival, Kilkenny Comedy Festival, Montreal Just for Laughs Festival, Edinburgh Fringe Festival and New Zealand International Comedy Festival. In September 2022, Gadsby signed a multi-title deal with Netflix.

Nanette
Gadsby created the stand-up show she named Nanette partly as a response to the public debate which took place in Australia before the law was changed to allow same-sex marriage, and also after her diagnosis of autism. Nanette explores topics such as homophobia, xenophobia, sexism, and gendered violence. Elahe Izadi of The Washington Post states although Nanette is a comedy, Gadsby insists the audience recognize the dark truth of trauma and assault. During the show, Gadsby says she is quitting comedy. In a review for Time Out of her next show Douglas, Ben Neutze wrote that in Nanette, "Gadsby's main objective was to deliver a fiery and furious takedown of the heterosexual patriarchy." According to Mary Luckhurst, writing in Persona Studies, "During Nanette, Gadsby ritually murdered her old persona and assumed a new high-status role that radically altered her relationship to the audience." After winning the Melbourne International Comedy Festival Barry award, the Edinburgh Festival Fringe Comedy Award, and Helpmann Award for Best Comedy Performer, Netflix released the film version of Nanette in 2018. On Rotten Tomatoes, Nanette received an approval rating of 100% based on reviews from 49 critics.

Douglas
In March 2019, Gadsby previewed her new show, Douglas, in Adelaide, before touring the U.S. and Australia, where many shows were sold out in advance. In the show, she explores new personal revelations "with empathy, wit and some extremely relatable metaphor", and creates something "bigger than comedy" according to one reviewer of the preview show. In Douglas, she discusses her autism diagnosis, aiming to help people understand neurodiversity as part of a normal variation of the human condition. In a review of the show for Time Out, Anne-Marie Peard wrote, "Douglas will create change and help people, especially undiagnosed women, to see that they may not have the right words to describe how they experience life; it's describing that experience to those who still say or think the words that belittle and damage." In 2020, Netflix released a filmed version of the live show.

Body of Work
In July 2021, Gadsby started with her solo show Body of Work in several venues in Australia, New Zealand, Europe, and the UK. Dates were also announced in the United States. In a review for The Guardian, Brian Logan wrote, "Its predecessors, the smash hits Nanette and Douglas, shot the Tasmanian to stardom – but weren't all smiles. Her latest, recounting romance and recent marriage to her producer Jenney Shamash, arrives with a lighter, looser vibe."

TV roles 
Gadsby co-wrote and co-starred in the Australian ABC TV show Adam Hills Tonight through three seasons from February 2011 to July 2013. She had regular segments called "On This Day" and "Hannah Has A Go" and also featured on the couch, contributing as host Adam Hills interviewed his guests. She co-wrote (with Matthew Bate) and presented a three-part series on ABC, Hannah Gadsby's Oz, which aired in March 2014. Produced by Closer Productions, this series set out to "debunk the myths of the Australian identity perpetuated by [its] national art". From 2013 to 2016, she co-wrote 20 episodes of the television series Please Like Me with fellow comedian Josh Thomas. In it, she played Hannah, a fictional version of herself.

Guest appearances 
Gadsby's Australian and international television appearances include Rove Live (2009), Good News Week (2009), Spicks and Specks (2010), Agony Aunts (2012), QI (2018), The Tonight Show Starring Jimmy Fallon (2018, 2020), and TV3's game show, 7 Days. She was a presenter at the 70th Primetime Emmy Awards in 2018, presenting the award for Outstanding Directing for a Drama Series. Gadsby was also a guest on Conan O'Brien's podcast Conan O'Brien Needs a Friend in 2019.

Art-related tours and shows 
Between 2009 and 2013, Gadsby presented comedy art tours in conjunction with the National Gallery of Victoria, with themes such as paintings of the Holy Virgin, Dadaism, Modernism, Impressionism and the nude in art. She has given talks on art and opened exhibitions. Gadsby has written and presented two documentary specials for the Artscape program on ABC TV: Hannah Gadsby Goes Domestic (2010) and The NGV Story (2011). In 2015, she wrote and performed Hannah Gadsby: Arts Clown, a series for BBC Radio 4 based on her comedy art shows.

Ten Steps to Nanette: A Memoir Situation

In March 2022, Gadsby published Ten Steps to Nanette: A Memoir Situation. The book was a New York Times bestseller. A review in Time by Trish Bendix stated the book "addresses the weighted issues of historical gender-based violence, misogyny, sexual abuse, homophobia, ableism and fatphobia, all of which Gadsby has directly experienced", and that Gadsby wrote, "I am triggering all the warnings." Kirkus Reviews wrote, "Consistently self-effacing and contemplative, Gadsby acknowledges that her unique brand of deadpan observational comedy isn't for everyone, especially since it often skewers 'the two most overly sensitive demographics the world has ever known: straight white cis men and self-righteous comedians. Thomas Floyd wrote in a review for The Washington Post, "In Ten Steps, she is understandably vague but remarkably vulnerable, writing: "I want the world to stop demanding gratuitous details in exchange for empathy. Entertainment in exchange for understanding."" Publishers Weekly wrote, "Gadsby resists centering her abusers, instead offering a candid, often bawdy account of her nonlinear path toward healing—shaped by a gauntlet of therapists, a career in 'mak[ing] a joke out of' her mental health, and her loving yet complex relationship with her family." Dana Dunham wrote for the Chicago Review of Books that Gadsby "describes Nanette inception, its iterations, and its careful layering, representing her thinking in actual images of her early notes and through artistic metaphor: the shapes of ideas, the palette of thoughts. Any artist, any creator should value the chance to examine the composition of this revolutionary work, and the context from which it came."

Awards 
 2006: Melbourne International Comedy Festival  Raw Comedy winner
 2006: Edinburgh Festival Fringe, So You Think You're Funny? – Second place
 2007: Adelaide Fringe, Best Newcomer Award for Hannah Gadsby is Wrong and Broken
 2010: Helpmann Award for Best Comedy Performer – nominee for The Cliff Young Shuffle
 2010: Melbourne International Comedy Festival – Directors' Choice Award 
 2011: Helpmann Award for Best Comedy Performer – nominee for Mrs Chuckles
 2011: Melbourne International Comedy Festival Barry Award nominee
 2017: Helpmann Award for Best Comedy Performer for Nanette
 2017: Melbourne International Comedy Festival, Barry Award winner for Nanette
 2017: Edinburgh Festival Fringe Comedy Award – joint winner for Nanette, tied with John Robins for The Darkness of Robins
 2017: Adelaide Fringe Best Comedy Award
 2018: 7th AACTA International Awards Best Comedy Program – nominee
 2018: AACTA Award for Best Performance in a Television Comedy
 2019: Helpmann Award for Best Comedy Performer for Douglas
 2019: MTV Movie & TV Awards – nominee for Best Real-Life Hero
 2019: Peabody Award for Nanette
 2019: Primetime Emmy Award for Outstanding Writing for a Variety Special for Nanette

Tours 
 Kiss Me Quick I'm Full of Jubes (2009)
 The Cliff Young Shuffle (2010)
 Mrs Chuckles (2011)
 Hannah Wants a Wife (2012)
 Happiness Is a Bedside Table (2013)
 The Exhibitionist (2014)
 Dogmatic (2015)
 Donkey (2016)
 Nanette (20172018)
 Douglas (2019)
 Body of Work (2021present)

Filmography

Television

Film

Bibliography

Personal life
Gadsby is openly lesbian and often includes LGBTQ-related themes in her stand-up routines.

Gadsby was diagnosed with ADHD and autism in 2017.

In January 2021, Gadsby married producer Jenney Shamash.

Gadsby is an active supporter of various charities. Organisations she has assisted include Big Brothers Big Sisters of Melbourne, Edmund Rice Camps of Victoria, and the Sacred Heart Mission.

References

External links 

 
 
 
 2019 TED Talk Three ideas. Three contradictions. Or not. Hannah Gadsby

Adam Hills Tonight
Australian National University alumni
Australian stand-up comedians
Living people
People from Smithton, Tasmania
Australian women comedians
Lesbian comedians
Actors with autism
Primetime Emmy Award winners
Australian lesbian actresses
Helpmann Award winners
Edinburgh Festival performers
1978 births
Australian LGBT comedians